is a museum in Kami, Kōchi Prefecture, Japan. It is dedicated to the life and works of Takashi Yanase (February 6, 1919 – October 13, 2013), who was a Japanese writer, poet, illustrator and lyricist

External links
 

Museums in Kōchi Prefecture
Anpanman
Kami, Kōchi
Literary museums in Japan
Biographical museums in Japan